The Reserve Forces Act 1996 is a piece of British legislation that provides for the maintenance and composition of the British military's Reserve Forces.

Provisions of the Act to make   
"An Act to make provision with respect to the reserve forces of the Crown and persons liable to be recalled for permanent service; to amend the provisions of the Reserve Forces Act 1980 relating to the lieutenancies; to amend the law relating to the postponement of the discharge of transfer of the reserve of regular servicemen; and for connected purposes."

The Act was signed into law on 22 May 1996.

Composition of the Reserve 
The Reserve Forces comprise:
 The Reserve Naval and Marine Forces - the Royal Fleet Reserve, the Royal Naval Reserve, and the Royal Marines Reserve.
 The Reserve Land Forces - the Army Reserve (Regular) and the Territorial Army (now known as the Army Reserve).
 The Reserve Air Forces - the Air Force Reserve and the Royal Auxiliary Air Force.

The Royal Fleet Reserve, the Army Reserve, and the Air Force Reserve are the Regular Reserve forces, comprising men and women who previously served in the regular forces and are liable for recall to active duty as reservists.

The Royal Naval Reserve, the Territorial Army, and the Royal Auxiliary Air Force are the Volunteer Reserve forces, comprising men and women who are members of the volunteer forces and liable to  be called for active duty.

In addition the act allows for the use of Sponsored Reserves whose employer enters into a contract with the Ministry of Defence to provide personnel to carry out specialist tasks as part of the armed forces. Examples are the Mobile Meteorological Unit, some of the staff on Royal Air Force transport aircraft (non flight crew) and some fleet container transport ships.

External links
Reserve Forces Act 1996

British defence policymaking
United Kingdom Acts of Parliament 1996
Reserve forces of the United Kingdom